The speckled spinetail (Cranioleuca gutturata) is a species of bird in the family Furnariidae. It is found in Bolivia, Brazil, Colombia, Ecuador, French Guiana, Peru, Suriname, and Venezuela. Its natural habitats are subtropical or tropical moist lowland forests and subtropical or tropical swamps.

References

speckled spinetail
Birds of the Amazon Basin
Birds of the Guianas
speckled spinetail
Taxonomy articles created by Polbot
Taxobox binomials not recognized by IUCN